KC Ten is the tenth studio album by the funk and disco group KC and the Sunshine Band. The album was produced by Harry Wayne Casey, Robert Walker, and Ron Taylor and was released in December 1983 on the Meca label.

History
KC Ten was credited only to group lead vocalist KC. The album includes the hit song "Give It Up", which had also been on the previous album. The single reached the top twenty on the Billboard Hot 100 and became their first and only number 1 single on the UK Singles Chart. The band disbanded after this album was released; eight years would pass before the band was reformed.

Track listing

Personnel
Harry Wayne Casey – keyboards, vocal
Emeridge Jones – keyboards
Ellis Parker Jr. – keyboards
Ron Taylor – keyboards
James Magnole – guitar
Jerome Smith – guitar
George Terry – guitar
Steve Argy – bass guitar 
Gary King – bass guitar
Joe Galdo – drums 
Fermin Goytisolo – percussion
Phil Rodriguez – percussion
Ricky Webb – percussion
Ken Faulk – trumpet
Eugene Timmons – saxophone
Deborah Carter – background vocals
Denise King – background vocals
Margaret Reynolds – background vocals
Jeanette Williams – background vocals
Betty Wright – background vocals

References

External links
 KC Ten at Discogs

KC and the Sunshine Band albums
1984 albums